Hot Wheels Battle Force 5 is a 2009 video game developed by Sidhe Interactive and published by Activision for the Wii and Nintendo DS, and a children's vehicular combat game based on the Hot Wheels Battle Force 5 3D animated television series created by Mattel.

Plot
During a mission, the Vandals get their hands on the Infinity Key, a device that opens all portals to Battle Zones. While Hatch tries to open it, the device malfunctions, separating the Battle Force 5, the Vandals, and the Sark. Vert, having been freed from capture early on, must find the rest of his team, reclaim the Infinity Key, and lock down the affected zones to stabilize them.

Gameplay
The game features vehicular combat in numerous "Battle Zones" with the Sark and Vandals. The gameplay-loop consists of Vert driving along a linear-path to a designated point in the environment, engaging in vehicular combat with enemies, freeing one of his partners, and then using their vehicle in the following level. Each vehicle has a unique ability, such as grenades and four-bladed buzz saws.

References

External links
Official website

2009 video games
Hot Wheels video games
Nintendo DS games
Video games developed in New Zealand
Wii games
Activision games
Multiplayer and single-player video games
Video games about parallel universes
Sidhe (company) games